Xiaobailou Subdistrict is a subdistrict of Heping District, Tianjin. it borders Guangfudao Subdistrict in the north, Dawangzhuang Subdistrict in the east, Dayingmen and Wudadao Subdistrict in the south, and Quanyechang Subdistrict in the west. It was once part of the American concession of Tianjin. As of 2010, its population was 30,982.

The name Xiaobailou originated back when this region was a foreign concession. Since the area did not have an official name yet, it was named after a two-story pub that was a local landmark.

Geography 
Xiaobailou Subdistrict is located on the west bank of Hai River.

History

Administrative divisions 
As of 2021, Xiaobailou Subdistrict was made up of the following 9 communities:

Gallery

References

Township-level divisions of Tianjin
Heping District, Tianjin